The Ven Karen Belinda Lund (born 1962) has been  Archdeacon of Manchester since 14 May 2017.

Lund studied for the  priesthood at Queen's College, Birmingham. After  curacies in Southall and Northolt she held posts in Gillingham, Kent and Chelmsford. Lund was team Vicar of Turton, Lancashire from 2014 until her appointment as Archdeacon.

References

1962 births
21st-century English Anglican priests
20th-century English Anglican priests
Alumni of the Queen's Foundation
Archdeacons of Manchester
Living people
Women Anglican clergy